Abdülkadir Kayalı (born 30 January 1991) is a Turkish footballer.

Career

Ankaragücü 
He was in the eyes of two English teams: Chelsea F.C. and Manchester City, and also had a trial with the latter club in the year 2007 and impressed, but due to being under 16 at the time a deal was not done. In Ankaragücü, he was taken out of the squad because he said he wouldn't extend his contract until he turned 18.

Fenerbahçe 
He left Ankaragücü on 3 January 2009 and moved to Fenerbahçe, signing a 4,5 year contract. He got the number 91 from his birth year (1991). On December 23, 2009 he made his debut against Altay in the Turkish Cup, coming on off the bench to replace Özer Hurmacı.

On 30 December  2009 Istanbul B.B. has signed Abdülkadir on loan from Fenerbahce for one and a half year.

Eskişehirspor 
Kayali was transferred to Eskişehirspor after Sezer Öztürk was to Fenerbahçe.

Orduspor
Kayali was transferred to Orduspor after was to Eskişehirspor.

Elazığspor
On the last day of the January transfermarket 2019, Kayalı was one of 22 players on two hours, that signed for Turkish club Elazığspor. had been placed under a transfer embargo but managed to negotiate it with the Turkish FA, leading to them going on a mad spree of signing and registering a load of players despite not even having a permanent manager in place. In just two hours, they managed to snap up a record 22 players - 12 coming in on permanent contracts and a further 10 joining on loan deals until the end of the season.

International 
He played 58 international games for many youth teams from Turkey.

He was also listed as one of the Top 10 players of the UEFA U-17 Championship Tournament in a recent UEFA article.

References

External links 

1991 births
People from Altındağ, Ankara
Living people
Turkish footballers
Turkey youth international footballers
Turkey under-21 international footballers
Turkey B international footballers
Association football midfielders
MKE Ankaragücü footballers
Fenerbahçe S.K. footballers
İstanbul Başakşehir F.K. players
Orduspor footballers
Boluspor footballers
Gaziantepspor footballers
Giresunspor footballers
Elazığspor footballers
Balıkesirspor footballers
Süper Lig players
TFF First League players